Raj Bahadur Gour was a freedom fighter and trade unionist. He was active with the Comrades Association and the Communist Party of India, and at the forefront of the 1946–1947 Telangana Rebellion against the Nizam of the erstwhile Hyderabad state. He was founder general secretary of the AITUC affiliated All Hyderabad Trade Union Council of which Makhdoom Mohiuddin was the president. He was elected to the Rajya Sabha in 1952 while in jail.

He died on 7 October 2011.

His body was being donated for research purposes to the Osmania Medical College.

References

2011 deaths
Communist Party of India politicians from Telangana